The income deprivation affecting children index (IDACI) is an index of deprivation used in the United Kingdom. 

The index is calculated by the Office of the Deputy Prime Minister and measures in a local area the proportion of children under the age of 16 that live in low income households. The local areas for which the index is calculated are super output areas. It is supplementary to the Indices of Multiple Deprivation and is used for calculation of the contextual value added score, measuring children's educational progress.

References

External links
 A tool on the DCSF website allowing IDACI to be looked up by postcode

Measurements and definitions of poverty
Office for National Statistics
Poverty in the United Kingdom